Melvin Sparks (March 22, 1946 – March 15, 2011) was an American soul jazz, hard bop and jazz blues guitarist. He recorded a number of albums for Prestige Records, later recording for Savant Records. He appeared on several recordings with musicians including Lou Donaldson, Sonny Stitt, Leon Spencer and Johnny Hammond Smith.

Career
Sparks was born in Houston, Texas, United States, and raised in a musical family. He received his first guitar at age 11. Sparks began working in the rhythm and blues genre as a high school student, first with Hank Ballard and the Midnighters, and then with the Upsetters, a touring band formed by Little Richard, which also backed Jackie Wilson, Curtis Mayfield and Marvin Gaye.

Sparks moved to New York City and worked as a session musician for Blue Note and Prestige Records. As part of the burgeoning soul-jazz scene of the late 1960s and early 1970s, Sparks often backed organists like Jack McDuff, Dr. Lonnie Smith, Charles Earland and Leon Spencer. Sparks released his debut album, Sparks!, for Prestige in 1970.

He was seen on Northeastern television commercials as the voice of Price Chopper's House of BBQ advertising campaign.

Sparks died on March 15, 2011, at age 64, at his home in Mount Vernon, New York. He had diabetes and high blood pressure.

Discography

As leader
Sparks! (Prestige, 1970; reissued on BGP/Ace in 1993) -with Leon Spencer
Spark Plug (Prestige, 1971) -with Grover Washington Jr.
Akilah! (Prestige, 1972; reissued on BGP/Ace in 1993)
Texas Twister (Eastbound, 1973; reissued on BGP/Ace in 1995)
Melvin Sparks '75 (Westbound/20th Century, 1975; reissued on BGP/Ace in 1995)
I'm Funky Now (Westbound/20th Century, 1976; previously unreleased material finally issued by Ace in 2017)
Sparkling (Muse, 1981)
I'm A 'Gittar' Player (Cannonball, 1997)
What You Hear Is What You Get (Nectar, 2001; Savant, 2003)
It Is What It Is (Savant, 2004)
This Is It! (Savant, 2005)
Groove On Up (Savant, 2006)
Live at Nectar's (One Note, 2010 [rel. 2017])

As sideman
With Henry "Pucho" Brown / Pucho & The Latin Soul Brothers
Jungle Strut (Lexington/West 47th, 1993)
Rip A Dip (Milestone, 1995)
With Rusty Bryant
Soul Liberation (Prestige, 1970) -with Charles Earland
With Hank Crawford
Indigo Blue (Milestone, 1983)
Down on the Deuce (Milestone, 1984)
Roadside Symphony (Milestone, 1985)
Night Beat (Milestone, 1989)
Groove Master (Milestone, 1990)
South Central (Milestone, 1992)
Tight (Milestone, 1996)
After Dark (Milestone, 1998)
Crunch Time (Milestone, 1998) -with Jimmy McGriff
The World of Hank Crawford (Milestone, 2002)
With Dennis Day
All Things in Time (D-Day Media, 2008)
With Joey DeFrancesco
All In The Family (HighNote, 1998)
Plays Sinatra His Way (HighNote, 2004)
With Papa John DeFrancesco
Hip Cake Walk (HighNote, 2001)
With Karl Denson
Dance Lesson #2 (Blue Note, 2001)
With Lou Donaldson
Hot Dog (Blue Note, 1969) -with Charles Earland
Everything I Play Is Funky (Blue Note, 1969)
The Scorpion (Blue Note, 1970)
Cosmos (Blue Note, 1971)
With Charles Earland
Black Talk! (Prestige, 1969)
Infant Eyes (Muse, 1979)
Pleasant Afternoon (Muse, 1981)
Slammin' & Jammin (Savant, 1998)
Cookin' with the Mighty Burner (HighNote, 1999)With Ceasar FrazierHail Ceasar! (Eastbound, 1972)With Red HollowayKeep That Groove Going! (Milestone, 2001) -with Plas Johnson
Coast to Coast (Milestone, 2003)With Etta JonesIf You Could See Me Now (Muse, 1978)With Charles KynardWa-Tu-Wa-Zui (Beautiful People) (Prestige, 1970)With Ron LevyZim Zam Zoom: Acid Blues on B-3 (Bullseye Blues, 1996)
Voodoo Boogaloo (Levtron, 2005)With Johnny LytleGood Vibes (Muse, 1982) 
Happy Ground (Muse, 1989)With Jack McDuffDo It Now! (Atlantic, 1966)
Double Barrelled Soul (Atlantic, 1967) -with David "Fathead" NewmanWith Jimmy McGriffCountdown (Milestone, 1983)
State of the Art (Milestone, 1985)
Blue to the 'Bone (Milestone, 1988)
Feelin' It (Milestone, 2001)
McGriff Avenue (Milestone, 2001)With Idris MuhammadBlack Rhythm Revolution! (Prestige, 1970)
Peace and Rhythm (Prestige, 1971)With John PattonSoul Connection (Nilva, 1983)With Houston PersonThe Nearness of You (Muse, 1977)
Suspicions (Muse, 1980) 
Heavy Juice (Muse, 1982)
We Owe It All To Love (Baseline [UK], 1989)
Christmas with Houston Person and Friends (Muse, 1994)With Sonny Phillips 
Black Magic (Prestige, 1970)
Black on Black! (Prestige, 1970)With Bernard PurdieBernard Purdie's Jazz Groove Sessions In Tokyo (Lexington/West 47th, 1993)With Alvin QueenLenox and Seventh (Black & Blue, 1985) -with Dr. Lonnie SmithWith Rhoda ScottVery Saxy: Live Au Meridien (Ahead, 2005) -with Ricky Ford, Houston PersonWith Johnny "Hammond" SmithWild Horses Rock Steady (Kudu/CTI, 1971)With Dr. Lonnie SmithThink! (Blue Note, 1968)
Turning Point (Blue Note, 1969)With Leon SpencerSneak Preview! (Prestige, 1970)
Louisiana Slim (Prestige, 1971)
Bad Walking Woman (Prestige, 1972)
Where I'm Coming From (Prestige, 1973)With Dakota StatonA Packet of Love Letters (HighNote, 1996)With Tom "T Bone" StinsonOn Fire (Golden Zebra, 2004)With Sonny Stitt 
Turn It On! (Prestige, 1971)
Black Vibrations (Prestige, 1971)With Leon ThomasLeon Thomas Blues Band (Portrait/Epic), 1988With Reuben WilsonBlue Mode (Blue Note, 1969)
The Cisco Kid (Groove Merchant, 1973)
Down with It (Cannonball, 1998)
Fun House (Savant, 2005)With Jimmy Witherspoon'''The Blues Is Now'' (Verve, 1967) -with Jack McDuff

See also
Jazz funk

References

1946 births
2011 deaths
American jazz guitarists
American session musicians
Hard bop guitarists
Jazz-blues guitarists
Muse Records artists
Musicians from Houston
Prestige Records artists
Soul-jazz guitarists
Guitarists from Texas
Guitarists from New York City
20th-century American guitarists
Jazz musicians from New York (state)
Jazz musicians from Texas